Hlae Sar (translated Deceive or Tricky) is a 2006 Burmese comedy drama film directed by Thein Maung (Phoenix), who is mainly involved in directing TV commercials.

Cast
Kyaw Ye Aung as Min Htet
Dwe as Zaw Latt
Thar Nyi
Khine Thin Kyi as Khine Mya Zin
Moe Di
Khin Hlaing
Chit Phwel
Min Min
Sonny (Burmese comedian)
Moe Kyaw
Kyu Kyu Thin
Aye Thida
San San Win
Sein Yoe
Pyae Phu Khaing
Chit Sa Yar

International release
On July 14, 2006, the comedy film Hlae Sar was released in Yangon.

References

2006 films
2000s Burmese-language films
2006 comedy-drama films
2006 comedy films
2006 drama films
Burmese comedy-drama films